The Spähpanzer Luchs (English: Scout Armored Car "Lynx") is a German 8x8 amphibious reconnaissance armoured fighting vehicle (Spähpanzer) that was in service from 1975 to 2009 with the German Army, who used 408 in their armoured reconnaissance battalions. It was developed by Daimler-Benz between 1968 and 1975, replacing the M41 and the Schützenpanzer SPz 11-2 Kurz.

Design
The all-wheel drive Luchs made by Thyssen-Henschel (now: Rheinmetall) is well armoured, has an NBC protection system and is characterized by its low-noise running. The eight large low-pressure tyres have run-flat properties. At speeds up to about 50 km/h, all four axles can be steered. As a special feature, the vehicle is equipped with a rear-facing driver with his own driving position. Up to the first combat effectiveness upgrade in 1986, the Luchs was fully amphibious and could surmount water obstacles quickly and independently using propellers at the rear and the fold back trim vane at the front.

The 20 mm Rheinmetall MK 20 Rh 202 gun in the turret is similar to the one in the Marder IFV. The upgrade to the Luchs A1 starting in 1986 included the incorporation of a thermal observation and gunnery system, which replaced the original infrared/white light night vision system mounted to the left of the turret. VHF radios have been the German SEM 25 / SEM 35 FM short range radios from LORENZ. HF long-range radio was the AN/GRC 9 with the LV 80 100 Watts RF amplifier for Morse Code. This was replaced by the XK 405 100 Watts SSB HF radio made by Rohde&Schwarz in Germany and the incorporation of the new SEM 80/90 radio system gave it the designation SpPz 2 Luchs A2. The Luchs was replaced by the Fennek in Bundeswehr service.

References

External links

 Luchs pictures

Armoured fighting vehicles of Germany
Armoured cars of the Cold War
Wheeled reconnaissance vehicles
Military vehicles introduced in the 1970s
Reconnaissance vehicles of the Cold War
Eight-wheeled vehicles